The Women's individual normal hill/5 km competition at the FIS Nordic World Ski Championships 2023 was held on 24 February 2023.

Results

Ski jumping
The ski jumping part was held at 11:32.

Cross-country skiing
The cross-country skiing part was held at 14:15.

References

Women's individual normal hill/5 km